Florin Laurențiu Popete (born 27 December 1977) is a Romanian former professional football player who played as a right back for teams such as Pandurii Târgu Jiu, Farul Constanța or Gilortul Târgu Cărbunești, among others. Popete played almost all his career for the team from his hometown, Pandurii Târgu Jiu. After retirement, he started to work as a manager for Pandurii Târgu Jiu Football Academy.

Honours
Pandurii Târgu Jiu
 Divizia C: 1999–2000
 Liga II: 2004–05

Gilortul Târgu Cărbunești
 Liga IV – Gorj County: 2018–19

External links
 
 

1977 births
Living people
Sportspeople from Târgu Jiu
Romanian footballers
Association football defenders
Liga I players
Liga II players
Liga III players
CS Pandurii Târgu Jiu players
FCV Farul Constanța players
ASA 2013 Târgu Mureș players